Kaskatamagan Sipi Wildlife Management Area is a protected wildlife management area located northeast of Shamattawa First Nation, Manitoba, Canada. The WMA is considered to be a Class Ib protected area under the IUCN protected area management categories.

History

Kaskatamagan Sipi Wildlife Management Area was established in 2009 under the Manitoba Wildlife Act.  The designation was part of the Manitoba Protected Areas Initiative.

Geography
Kaskatamagan Sipi Wildlife Management Area lies northeast of the remote community of Shamattawa, within the traditional territory of Shamattawa First Nation. There are no roads or facilities for visitors.

Drainage flows generally to the north east. The Machichi River flows through the WMA towards its mouth in Hudson Bay. The WMA includes the headwaters of several of its left tributaries.

Ecology
Kaskatamagan Sipi Wildlife Management Area is within the Hudson Bay Lowland Ecoregion in the Hudson Plains Ecozone.

The WMA provides winter range for caribou who summer near the coast of Hudson Bay. The WMA is at the northern extent of the northern leopard frog in Manitoba.

Bird species found in the WMA include:

Mammal species found in the WMA include:

See also
 List of wildlife management areas in Manitoba
 List of protected areas of Manitoba

References

External links
 Kaskatamagan Sipi Wildlife Management Area
 iNaturalist: Kaskatamagan Sipi Wildlife Management Area

Protected areas established in 2009
Wildlife management areas of Manitoba
Nature reserves in Manitoba